Valeriya Berezhna (born 24 July 2000) is a Ukrainian synchronised swimmer. She won two bronze medals at the inaugural European Games where she was third in team and combination competitions.

References

2000 births
Living people
Ukrainian synchronized swimmers
European Games medalists in synchronised swimming
European Games bronze medalists for Ukraine
Synchronised swimmers at the 2015 European Games
Sportspeople from Kharkiv Oblast
21st-century Ukrainian women